The  is a limited-stop "Rapid" service operated by the East Japan Railway Company (JR East) as a sightseeing train in Niigata Prefecture, Japan since May 2014.

Operations

Rolling stock
Services are operated by a three-car diesel multiple unit set based at Niitsu Depot, converted from former KiHa 40, 48 DMU cars.

See also
 Joyful Train

References

External links

 JR East Koshino Shu*Kura

Named passenger trains of Japan
East Japan Railway Company